Curione is a surname. Notable people with the surname include:

Celio Secondo Curione (1503–1569), Italian humanist, grammarian, editor and historian
Celio Augustino Curione (1538-1567), Italian scholar
Laura Curione (born 1988), Italian bobsledder 

Surnames of Italian origin